The Golden Girls is a 1995 Hong Kong romantic comedy film directed by Joe Ma and starring Lau Ching-wan and Anita Yuen. The film is not related to the US TV sitcom of the same name.

Cast
 Lau Ching-wan as Chun-wai
 Anita Yuen as Mei-ball
 Ada Choi as Lulu Shum
 Alien Sun as May Chu 
 Allen Fong as Assistant director
 Nancy Lan as Assistant director
 Manfred Wong as Director of Cleopatra
 Francis Ng as Wong Siu-yi
 Cheung Tat-ming as Cousin J.P.
 Yeung Bing-lam as Lam Sin
 Pak Yiu-charn as Studio boss
 Wong Yat-fei as Brother Choi
 Vincent Kok as Kent
 Michael Tse as Fey Leading Man
 Lee Lik-chi as Priest
 Josephine Koo as Sister Sen
 Tin Kai-man as Trainee actor with cigarette in mouth
 Chan Hau-yee as New actress
 Cheung Chi-sing as Cinematographer
 Cheuk Wai-man as Studio boss' secretary
 David Lai as Projectionist
 Leung Pui-san as Trainee actress
 June Chan as Trainee actress
 Irsi Chai as Trainee actress
 Perry Chiu as Trainee actress
 Lok Sze-man as Trainee actress
 Chan Chor-man as Trainee actress
 Alan Mak as Assistant director
 Lam Suk-foon as Make up artist A
 Irene Kong as Make up artist B
 Lung Chi-shing as Traitor
 Chan Hing-hang as Cinematographer
 Wong Wa-wo as Reporter
 So Wai-nam as Cousin's bodyguard
 So Wai-nam as Cousin's bodyguard

See also
 List of Hong Kong films

External links
 
 HK Cinemagic entry

1995 films
1995 romantic comedy films
Hong Kong romantic comedy films
1990s Cantonese-language films
China Star Entertainment Group films
Films directed by Joe Ma
Films about screenwriters
Films about actors
Films set in the 1960s
Films set in the 1970s
Films set in Hong Kong
Films shot in Hong Kong
1990s Hong Kong films